New Middleton is an unincorporated community in Columbiana County, in the U.S. state of Ohio.

History
New Middleton was platted before 1825.

References

Unincorporated communities in Columbiana County, Ohio
1825 establishments in Ohio
Populated places established in 1825
Unincorporated communities in Ohio